The 1922 Navy Midshipmen football team represented the United States Naval Academy during the 1922 college football season. In their third season under head coach Bob Folwell, the Midshipmen compiled a 5–2 record, shut out four opponents, and outscored all opponents by a combined score of 185 to 37.

The annual Army–Navy Game was played on November 25 at Franklin Field in Philadelphia; Army won

Schedule

References

Navy
Navy Midshipmen football seasons
Navy Midshipmen football